Behzad Cinema is the oldest movie theatre in Afghanistan, established by the local government of Kabul. It was built in 1934 by the Kabul Municipality, in the old city area of Bagh-e-Qazi. However, it was abandoned and has since become a ruin. The cinema reopened during Mohammed Zahir Shah's reign and has become a hotspot for clandestine groups and drug users, as reported in November 2020.

See also 
 Cinema of Afghanistan
 Ariana Cinema

References

1934 establishments in Afghanistan
Cinemas in Afghanistan